In 2015, Japanese Prime Minister Shinzō Abe and the ruling Liberal Democratic Party promoted legislation, passed on 19 September 2015, despite some public opposition, to allow the country's military to participate in foreign conflicts, overturning its previous policy of fighting only in self-defense. Since the Japanese constitution allows the Japanese military to act only in self-defense, the legislation reinterpreted the relevant passages to allow the military to operate overseas for "collective self-defense" for allies. The legislation came into effect on 29 March 2016.

Background
Article 9 of the Japanese Constitution prohibits use of military force internationally. On 15 May 2014, an advisory panel formed by Abe recommended that Article 6 be reinterpreted to allow a broader use of military power. On 1 July, the government announced that it had devised a policy dubbed "collective self defense" to allow it to use armed force to defend its allies. Abe had originally proposed to give the military even more leeway, but resistance from lawmakers in both parties of the governing coalition led to softening of the language. With Abe's coalition a majority in both houses of parliament, the language was expected to be passed into law later in the year.

In February 2015, Abe said that he planned to begin work to amend Article 9 after the 2016 parliamentary elections. Abe cited the beheading of two Japanese hostages by the Islamic State of Iraq and the Levant (commonly known as ISIS) in his goal of allowing Japan's military to intervene overseas to protect Japanese citizens.

Legislative history

On 26 May 2015, the House of Representatives, the lower chamber of the National Diet, began debate on a package of eleven bills, granting the military the power to engage in foreign combat in limited circumstances It is called the "Peace and Security Preservation Legislation" by its sponsors. Debate in the Diet had been scheduled to end in June, but a final vote was later delayed to September.

On 16 July 2015, the House of Representatives passed the legislation, the final version of which allowed the military to provide logistical support to allies overseas as well as armed support in circumstances when inaction would endanger "the lives and survival of the Japanese nation." The vote was passed on the strength of the majority coalition of LDP and Komeito lawmakers; members of the opposition boycotted the vote in protest.

After passage of the bill in the House of Representatives, the House of Councillors, the upper house of the National Diet, debated the bill for two months. It passed in committee on 17 September in a contentious vote in which opposition lawmakers attempted to restrain the committee chairman physically. Then, it moved to the full house for a final vote. Early in the morning on 19 September, the bill passed the full house after a delayed vote in which opposition members used various delaying tactics to draw out the process. In an effort to delay passage until after the Silver Week holiday, Yukio Edano of the Democratic Party of Japan spoke for 104 minutes (having planned to speak for four hours) in support of a no confidence motion against the cabinet, and Tarō Yamamoto of the People's Life Party attempted to delay voting by walking very slowly to the ballot box.

Effects
The legislation has been effective since 29 March 2016. One of the first applications of the legislation was to authorize the Self-Defense Forces peacekeeping team in South Sudan to aid UN or foreign countries' personnel under attack in the country.

While the legislation is expected to allow Japanese and US forces to work more closely together, such as by forming integrated naval task forces to repel an invasion of Japan, Defense Minister Gen Nakatani denied that Japan would always come to the aid of the US, and Prime Minister Abe specifically ruled out the possibility of extending SDF support for the coalition fighting the Islamic State of Iraq and the Levant.

It is reported that Tokyo is sending JGSDF officers to participate with the Multinational Force and Observers in April 2019 by using the new law as a basis.

Public opposition

The legislation was controversial within Japan. According to some polls conducted in July, at the time of the legislation's debate in the House of Representatives, two thirds of the Japanese public opposed the bills. A protest on 16 July drew an estimated 100,000 people to the National Diet building. Later protests in September ahead of the House of Councillors vote drew crowds of 10,000 to 30,000.

The Abe governments's approval rating fell below its disapproval rating after the House of Representatives passed the legislation in July 2015 and again after it finally approved it in September. A slight majority of poll respondents in September thought that Japan's deterrent capabilities would not be strengthened by the legislation.

Much opposition to the legislation centered on its alleged questionable constitutionality. Repeated surveys of experts in Japan's constitution showed that more than 90% of those surveyed believed it was unconstitutional, and in June, Waseda University professor Yasuo Hasebe, in an address to the Diet with two other constitutional scholars, said that it would "considerably damage the legal stability" of Japan. After its passage, it was expected to be challenged in court, although Japan's legal system has rarely ruled against the government in security matters.  A revision of the Japanese constitution to revise Article 9 would require a national referendum, which perceived current public opposition to Abe and the legislation made it thought to be unlikely to succeed in the short term. In defense of the bills, Nihon University professor Akira Momochi argued that the legislation was in keeping with the United Nations Charter, saying that the right to self-defense is "a given for international laws, and that supersedes national laws."

See also
Coalition of the willing – Japan's military was involved in the conflict in Iraq
Japanese Iraq Reconstruction and Support Group

References

External links
Japan's Fistfights and Foreign Wars by Angela Carlton / Midwest Diplomacy
Yuki's Take / Security legislation points to a bigger problem By Yuki Tatsumi / Special to The Japan News (The Yomiuri Shimbun)

2015 controversies
2015 in Japanese politics
2015 in law
2015 in military history
Japanese defence policies
Controversies in Japan
Japanese legislation
Legal history of Japan
Military history of Japan
Overseas deployments of the Japan Self-Defense Forces
Human rights in Japan